Say Forever You'll Be Mine is the twelfth collaborative studio album by Porter Wagoner and Dolly Parton. It was released on August 18, 1975, by RCA Victor. It would be their last album of new material together until 1980.

Critical reception
In the issue date August 30, 1975, Billboard published a review that said, "As always when the pair get together, a fine set of love songs giving each a chance to display their vocal wares separately as well as working in their general perfectly succinct harmony. Dolly is enjoying her strongest period of success as a solo yet and Wagoner is a consistent
chart maker, yet together they always seem to rise to new heights. Material a bit more on the straight country side than their solo material, with the writing split as usual fairly evenly between the two. Production of Porter is excellent. Instrumentally,
fiddle and guitar work in particular shines on this set."

Cashbox also published a review in their August 30 issue which said, "Running the gamut of most every phase of love, this Porter and Dolly LP includes "Something to Reach For", "If You Were Mine", "I Have No Right to Care", "The Beginning", "Our Love," "Again", "How Can I (Help You Forgive Me)", "Love to See Us Through", and of course the title song, which is also their current chart climbing single, "Say Forever You'll Be Mine". The sound is gentle and pure country, serving as a perfect foil for the cameo performance of these two great country artists."

Commercial performance
The album peaked at No.6 on the US Billboard Hot Country LP's chart.

The album's only single, "Say Forever You'll Be Mine", was released in June 1975 and peaked at No. 5 on the US Billboard Hot Country Singles chart.

Recording
Only three tracks on the album resulted from new recording sessions, "Our Love", "If You Were Mine", and "Love to See Us Through" were recorded during an April 15, 1975 session at RCA Studio B in Nashville, Tennessee. The seven others tracks included on the album date as far back as 1972. "Say Forever You'll Be Mine" is the oldest track included and was recorded on August 21, 1972, during a session for 1973's We Found It. "I Have No Right to Care" and "How Can I (Help You Forgive Me)" were recorded during a session for 1973's Love and Music on February 12, 1973. Four tracks were recorded during sessions for 1974's Porter 'n' Dolly. "Something to Reach For" and "Again" were recorded on May 23, 1974, while "The Beginning" and "Life Rides the Train" were recorded the following day.

Track listing

Charts 
Album

Singles

References

1975 albums
Albums produced by Bob Ferguson (music)
RCA Records albums
Dolly Parton albums
Porter Wagoner albums
Vocal duet albums